Franklin Boulevard Historic District may refer to:

 Franklin Boulevard Historic District (Pontiac, Michigan), listed on the NRHP in Michigan
 Franklin Boulevard Historic District (Cleveland, Ohio), listed on the NRHP in Ohio
 Franklin Boulevard-West Clinton Avenue Historic District, Cleveland, OH, listed on the NRHP in Ohio